The 2005 season was the Dallas Cowboys' 46th in the National Football League (NFL), their 17th under the ownership of Jerry Jones, their 34th playing their home games at Texas Stadium, and their third season under head coach Bill Parcells.  Despite the Cowboys being 7–3 by Week 11 and tying the Giants for first in the NFC East, the Cowboys suffered a season collapse going 2–4 during the last six games.  The Cowboys missed the playoffs for the second consecutive season after the  Washington Redskins  beat the Philadelphia Eagles.  However, the Cowboys were able to improve on their 6–10 record from last season and finished the season at 9–7.

Offseason
During the 2005 offseason, the team found a temporary solution to the quarterback situation by signing former Buffalo Bills quarterback Drew Bledsoe.  Earlier in his career, Bledsoe played for Bill Parcells while he was the coach for the New England Patriots.  The Cowboys also signed cornerbacks Aaron Glenn and Anthony Henry.

Also, during free agency, the Cowboys signed former Green Bay Packers guard Marco Rivera and former New York Jets defensive tackle Jason Ferguson.

The Cowboys also lost their last remaining three-time Super Bowl champion when Darren Woodson announced his retirement just before the offseason began.

The Cowboys installed a 3–4 defensive scheme, marking the first departure from the 4–3 defense since the club
was founded in 1960. In their first year in the new system the team finished tenth in the NFL in total defense and opponents completed just 54.7 percent of their passes against the Cowboys’ secondary, the second-lowest number in the NFL that year.

Draft class

Notes
 The Cowboys traded their 2004 first-round (No. 22 overall) selection to the Buffalo Bills in exchange for 2004 second (No. 43 overall) and fifth-round (No. 144 overall) selections, and a 2005 first-round (No. 20 overall) selection.
 The Cowboys traded their 2005 third-round (No. 73 overall) selection to the Houston Texans in exchange for rights to quarterback Drew Henson.
 The Cowboys traded their 2005 fifth-round (No. 146 overall) and 2006 fourth-round (No. 116 overall) selections to the Philadelphia Eagles for 2005 fourth-round (No. 132 overall) selection and 2006 sixth-round (No. 182 overall) selections.
 The Cowboys traded their 2004 seventh-round (No. 223 overall) and 2005 sixth-round (No. 185 overall) selections to the Oakland Raiders for defensive tackle Kenyon Coleman.

Staff

Roster

Preseason

Schedule

Regular season

Schedule

Game summaries

Week 1: at San Diego Chargers

After losing on opening weekend for five straight years, the Cowboys looked to end the streak on opening weekend against the San Diego Chargers.  The defending AFC West Champion Chargers just had a 12–4 season and they were at home.  The game was not decided until the final 30 seconds, when looking to score the game-winning touchdown on the Dallas 7-yard line, San Diego Quarterback Drew Brees threw an interception to Aaron Glenn.  Both teams would go on to finish with 9–7 record. This was the Cowboys' last win against the Chargers until 2021.

Week 2: vs. Washington Redskins

Going into the game, the Dallas Cowboys had won 14 of the last 15 meetings between the two teams. After holding a 13–0 lead with 3:46 remaining in the fourth quarter, the Redskins came out with an extremely improbable rally late in the fourth quarter to stun the Cowboys 14–13 when Mark Brunell threw two touchdown passes to Santana Moss.  It was the first time (after 77 times) that Coach Parcells lost after going into the fourth quarter with at least a 13-point lead. The Redskins had won in Texas Stadium for the first time in a decade.

Week 3: at San Francisco 49ers

The Dallas Cowboys did the exact opposite of what they did a week earlier by scoring 15 unanswered point in the fourth quarter to shock the 49ers 34–31, in a game that was decided with less than 2 minutes remaining.

Week 4: at Oakland Raiders

Despite staying in the Bay area over the week to prepare for the game against the Raiders game, the Cowboys were unable to take advantage of the winless Oakland Raiders, and failed to score on a potential game saving drive late in the fourth quarter.

Week 5: vs. Philadelphia Eagles

The Cowboys exploded offensively in what Parcells said was the best performance he has seen since coming to Dallas.  The Cowboys would not let the Eagles offense score a single touchdown (they had one defensive touchdown), and the Cowboys outscored the Eagles 27–3 in the first half to put the game out of reach.

Week 6: vs. New York Giants

Dallas hoped to continue playing great offensively as they did in the previous week by beating the New York Giants at home.  Instead, they played very sloppily and Coach Parcells said his team was "fortunate" to win.  The Cowboys were sacked 4 times for a loss of 36 yards and turned over the ball 4 times.

The Cowboys lost left tackle Flozell Adams for the remainder of the season when he tore an ACL in his knee.  With an immobile quarterback like Drew Bledsoe, this would be devastating for the Dallas Cowboys later in the Season because Bledsoe would be sacked 36 more times over the course of ten games (3.6 sacks per game), compared to having been sacked 13 times during the first six games (2.17 sacks per game). Bledsoe would also throw 13 more interceptions after this game (while throwing only 4 picks during the first six games).

Week 7: at Seattle Seahawks

The Cowboys came to Seattle for a defensive showdown.  After scoring a touchdown early in the first quarter, the Cowboys had the lead until 59 minutes and 20 second into the game when Seattle tied the game at 10–10.  Trying to win with 14 seconds left in regulation, Drew Bledsoe threw an interception and Seahawks kicker Josh Brown kicked the game-winning field goal, taking their first lead of the game as time expired.

Jose Cortez missed a field goal which cost Dallas the game, and he was fired after the game. Ryan Hannam, who scored a game-tying touchdown late in the fourth quarter signed with the Dallas Cowboys as a free agent the following season.

Week 8: vs. Arizona Cardinals

The Dallas Cowboys bounced back from a loss a week earlier and routed the Arizona Cardinals. The Cowboys had a new kicker on their roster, rookie Shaun Suisham, and another rookie making his first start was Marion Barber, who was starting in place of injured Julius Jones. He ran for 127 yards and scored two touchdowns in his breakout game.

Week 10: at Philadelphia Eagles

The Cowboys came to Philadelphia hoping to sweep the Eagles for the first time since 1998 and beat them at Philadelphia for the first time since 1998.  After trailing by 13 points late in the fourth quarter, the Cowboys stunned the Eagles by scoring two touchdowns (one of which was an interception return) to win the game 21–20.  Also, Donovan McNabb injured his knee, and he would leave for the remainder of the season.

This was the last Cowboys game to air on ABC as the network's relationship with the NFL ended after the 2005 season.

Week 11: vs. Detroit Lions
 
Earlier in the week, Coach Parcells hung mousetraps in the locker room to warn his players that this game was a "trap game". Dallas rushed for 149 yards and 2 touchdowns, and kicker Billy Cundiff kicked a franchise record 56-yard field goal.  After the game, the Cowboys were 7–3 and tied for second place in the NFC. The Cowboys had already won more games than they did in the previous season.

Week 12: vs. Denver Broncos

In the annual Thanksgiving Day Game, the Dallas Cowboys hosted the Denver Broncos. The Cowboys offense had 314 yards, greater than Denver's 293 yards, but Cowboys kicker Billy Cundiff a missed field goal in the fourth quarter and so the game went into overtime.  Denver won the coin toss and Broncos backup running back Ron Dayne ran 55 yards on the second play in overtime and Jason Elam kicked the game-winning field goal.

Week 13: at New York Giants

In this season's rematch, the New York Giants made the Dallas Cowboys pay for an overtime 16–13 win earlier in the season, but both teams had a sloppy performance overall.  Both teams threw two interceptions, but the Cowboys lost two fumbles.  Drew Bledsoe was sacked 4 times for a loss of 21 yards, both quarterbacks completed under 40% of their passes, and both teams missed a field goal.  The Giants ran for 127 yards rushing (including 115 yards by Tiki Barber) and one rushing touchdown which made the difference in the game.

Week 14: vs. Kansas City Chiefs

In a back-and-forth offensive thriller, Kansas City running back Larry Johnson scored three touchdowns and Drew Bledsoe threw for three touchdowns.  The Chiefs offense had 493 yards, more than the Cowboys 445 yards, but the Chiefs mistakes (including a lost fumble) made the difference in the game.

Week 15: at Washington Redskins

Washington gave Bill Parcells his biggest loss ever as an NFL coach.  Tight end Chris Cooley had a career day catching three touchdown passes.  After being down 35–0 early in the fourth quarter, Dallas prevented a shutout by throwing a consolation touchdown pass to Jason Witten.  Drew Bledsoe was sacked seven times and threw three interceptions.  Only the Danny White-led Dallas 44–14 victory on September 9, 1985, had a larger margin of victory between the two teams.

Week 16: at Carolina Panthers

Going into the game, the Panthers needed a win to secure a playoff spot.  The Cowboys needed a win to stay alive in the playoff race after losing three out of the last four games.  Despite falling behind 0–10 early in the game, the Cowboys rallied to outscore Carolina 17–3 for almost three quarters, including two Julius Jones touchdowns.  Julius Jones rushed for 194 yards, the fourth best in franchise history.  Late in the fourth quarter while trailing 17–20, Billy Cundiff attempted to tie the game on a 33-yard field goal, but missed.  The only reason Dallas still managed to win the game was because Carolina was penalized for "running into the kicker" (Carolina contended that they had slightly blocked the kick but replays proved inconclusive) and Terry Glenn scored a touchdown with one hand to take the lead (he dislocated his hand early in the game).

Billy Cundiff had a 32-yard field goal attempt blocked, and missed a 33-yard attempt.  He already missed two field goals earlier in the season, including one that cost Dallas the game on Thanksgiving against Denver, so two days after the game he was fired by coach Parcells .  Carolina won next week to secure a wildcard spot in the playoffs, but despite several likely playoff scenarios Dallas was eliminated from the playoffs before their last game when the Panthers, the Redskins, and the Giants all won a week later.

Week 17: vs. St. Louis Rams

Only minutes before the game, the Cowboys were eliminated from the playoff race when the Washington Redskins beat the Philadelphia Eagles  The deflated Cowboys only managed to score 10 points against the St. Louis Rams, who came into the game 5–10. After running for a meager 35 yards, Julius Jones had 993 yards for the season, painfully just 7 yards short of 1,000 yards.

Just days after the game, head coach Bill Parcells announced he was staying for at least one more season, and his contract was extended through 2007.  At the time, there had been some speculation he would be retiring.

Standings

References

External links
 2005 Dallas Cowboys
 Pro Football Hall of Fame
 Dallas Cowboys Official Site

Dallas Cowboys
Dallas Cowboys seasons
Dallas